Klein Rogahn is a municipality  in the Ludwigslust-Parchim district, in Mecklenburg-Vorpommern, Germany.

Notable people
 (1921–2006), martial music composer
 (1904–1994), political commissar (SED) and vice admiral of the National People's Army of East Germany

References

Ludwigslust-Parchim